Billson may refer to:

People
Alfred Billson (British politician) (1839-1907), English Liberal Party politician 
Alfred Author Billson (1858-1930), Australian politician
Anne Billson (born 1954), British writer, photographer, and film critic
Bruce Billson (born 1966), Australian politician
Charles J. Billson (1858-1932), English translator, lawyer and collector of folklore
Herbert George Billson (1971-1938), British colonial administrator, scientist, and rugby player
John Billson (1862-1924), British-born Australian politician
William W. Billson (1847-1923), American lawyer and politician

Fictional
Battling Billson, a short stories character by P.G. Wodehouse

See also
Bilson